Peter Fulde (born 6 April 1936 in Breslau, now Wroclaw) is a physicist working in condensed matter theory and quantum chemistry.

Fulde received a PhD degree at the University of Maryland in 1963. After spending more than one year as a postdoc with Michael Tinkham in Berkeley, he returned in 1965 to Germany where he obtained a chair for theoretical physics in 1968 at the Johann Wolfgang Goethe University in Frankfurt/M. From 1971 to 1974 he was in charge of the theory group of the Institute Max von Laue-Paul Langevin in Garching. In 1971 he became a director at the Max Planck Institute for Solid State Research in Stuttgart where he served until 1993 when he became the founding director of the Max Planck Institute for the Physics of Complex Systems in Dresden. After his retirement in 2007 he became president of the Asia Pacific Center for Theoretical Physics and a faculty member at POSTECH in Pohang (Korea). He directed the center until 2013.

Fulde has made numerous contributions to condensed matter physics including superconductivity and correlated electrons in molecules and solids. Particularly known is the Fulde-Ferrell-Larkin-Ovchinnikov (FFLO) phase which may occur when fermions with imbalanced populations are paired.

Fulde is a founding member of the Berlin-Brandenburg Academy of Sciences and Humanities (former Preussische Akadamie der Wissenschaften). He is a member of the German Academy of Sciences Leopoldina and Deutsche Akademie für Technikwissenschaften (acatech). Among his awards are the Order of Merit of the Free State of Saxony (2007), the Tsungming Tu Award of the National Science Council of Taiwan (2009) and the Marian-Smoluchowski-Emil-Warburg-Award of the German and Polish Physical Societies (2011).
He is an Honorary Citizen of the Province Gyeongsangbuk do of the Republic of Korea (2014) and of the City of Pohang (2016).

Selected publications

P. Fulde “Crystal fields”, Chapter 17 in "Handbook on the physics and chemistry of rare-earth", ed. by K. A. Gschneider and L. Eyring; North-Holland Publ. Comp. (1978) 
"Electron Correlations in Molecules and Solids", 480 pp. (Springer, Heidelberg 1991, 1993, 1995) 
"Correlated Electrons in Quantum Matter", 535 pp. (World Scientific, Singapore, 2012); ebook ; pbk

References

See also
 Fulde-Ferrell-Larkin-Ovchinnikov phase

1936 births
Living people
20th-century German physicists
Recipients of the Order of Merit of the Free State of Saxony
Members of the German Academy of Sciences Leopoldina
University of Hamburg alumni
University of Maryland, College Park alumni
Max Planck Institute directors
People from Wrocław
Academic staff of Goethe University Frankfurt
Academic staff of Pohang University of Science and Technology
German physicists
Condensed matter physicists